National Highway 167 (NH 167), is a national highway in India, which was formed as a new National Highway by up-gradation and passes through the states of Karnataka, Telangana and Andhra Pradesh. It starts at Hagari in Karnataka and ends at Kodad in Telangana. It is a secondary route of National Highway 67.

Route 

It starts at the junction of Hagari and passes through Alur, Adoni, Yemmiganur, Mantralayam, Raichur, Mahabubnagar, Jadcherla, Kalwakurthy, Deverakonda, Konda malle pally,  Haliya, NIDMANOOR , Miryalaguda, Nereducherla, Huzurnagar, Kodad in Telangana.

State–wise route length (in km.)

Andhra Pradesh – 
Karnataka – 
Telangana -

Junctions list 

  Terminal near Haggari.
  near Krishna.
  near Jadcherla.
  near Kalwakurthy.
  near NIDAMANOOR.
  Terminal near Kodad.

Sirat-e-joodi bridge
Sirat-e-joodi bridge over Krishna river was constructed between 1933 and 1943. The bridge was named as Sirat-e-joodi in honour of Nawab Javvadjaha Bahadur, the prince of Hyderabad.

See also 
 List of National Highways in India
 List of National Highways in India by State

References

External links 

 NH 167 on OpenStreetMap

National highways in India
National Highways in Karnataka
National Highways in Andhra Pradesh
National Highways in Telangana